In embryology, the primordial phallus refers to the clitoris of a female or the penis in the male, particularly during fetal development of the urinary and reproductive organs, before sexual differentiation is evident. This is also the case for the immature male analog, the immature glans penis.

See also
 Aphallia
 Genital tubercle

Embryology of urogenital system